Jan Peters may refer to:

Jan Peters (footballer, born 1953), Dutch footballer who played in one match for the Netherlands national football team in 1979
Jan Peters (footballer, born 1954), Dutch footballer and coach
Jan Peters (computer scientist) (born 1976), German computer scientist
Jan Peters (engineer), British engineer
Jēkabs Peterss (1886–1938), also known as "Jan Peters", Soviet revolutionary

See also
 Jan Petersen (disambiguation)